The Syriac Sinaiticus or Codex Sinaiticus Syriacus (syrs), known also as the Sinaitic Palimpsest, of Saint Catherine's Monastery (Sinai, Syr. 30), or Old Syriac Gospels is a late-4th- or early-5th-century manuscript of 179 folios, containing a nearly complete translation of the four canonical Gospels of the New Testament into Syriac, which have been overwritten by a vita (biography) of female saints and martyrs with a date corresponding to AD 697. This palimpsest is the oldest copy of the Gospels in Syriac, one of two surviving manuscripts (the other being the Curetonian Gospels) that are conventionally dated to before the Peshitta, the standard Syriac translation.

Text
Both the Syriac Sinaiticus (designated syrs) [Sinai, Syr 30] and the Curetonian Gospels (designated syrcur) [British Library, Add 14451; Staatsbibliothek, Berlin, Orient Quad 528] known as the Old Syriac version contain similar renderings of the Gospel text; its conformity with the Greek and the Latin has been debated. Additional passages of the Old Syriac version were discovered among the New Finds (1975) of Saint Catherine's Monastery (Sinai, Syr. NF 37, 39). Even so, syrs retains some readings from even earlier lost Syriac Gospels and from the 2nd-century Septuagint manuscripts, which brought the four Gospels into harmony with one another through selective readings and emendations.

It had been ascertained that the Diatessaron, or Harmony of the Four Gospels, composed by Tatian in the second century, had to be supplanted in the Syrian churches.  There was a promulgation by Bishop Rabbula of Edessa in between AD 411 and 435, that four separate Gospels come into being in use in Syriac churches.

The importance of such early, least conforming texts is emphasized by the revision of the Peshitta that was made about 508, ordered by bishop Philoxenus of Mabbog. His revision, it is said, skilfully moved the Peshitta nearer to the Greek text; "it is very remarkable that his own frequent Gospel quotations preserved in his writings show that he used an Old Syriac set of the four Gospels".

History
The palimpsest was identified in the library at Saint Catherine's Monastery in February 1892 by Agnes Smith Lewis, who returned with a team of scholars in 1893 that included J. Rendel Harris, F. C. Burkitt, and R. L. Bensly to photograph and transcribe the work in its entirety. It is still kept by the Saint Catherine’s Monastery (Sinai, Syr. 30).

The Sinaitic Palimpsest immediately became a central document in tracing the history of the New Testament. The palimpsest's importance lies especially in making the Greek New Testament manuscripts understandable to Aramaic speaking communities during that period.

Notable readings

The palimpsest lacks the last 12 verses of Mark, Christ's agony, the Pericope Adulteræ, and the reconciliation of Pilate with Herod.

In , it contains "Joseph, to whom was betrothed Mary the Virgin, begat Jesus, who is called the Christ"

In , it contains a singular reading reflecting the Greek  ('get you behind' or 'get behind you').

 is omitted, as in א*, B, L, Γ, 1009, ℓ 12, ff1, k, syrc, copsa.

In , it reflects  ('corpse') with א B C D L Θ f1 f13 33 565 700 892 1241 1424 e k ℓ 844 ℓ 2211 syrc, p copbo

In , it reflects  ('leaven') with D, Θ, f13, 565, a, b, ff2

 is omitted, as in 𝔓104, D, 33, ita.b.d.e, ff1, ff2, r1, Irenaeuslat, Origen, Eusebius

In , text reflecting  ('Jeremiah') is omitted, as in Φ 33 ita itb syrp copbo

In , it reflects  ('Jesus the Barabbas') with Θ f1 700* arm geo2

In , the phrase when Abiathar was high priest is omitted, as in D, W, 1009, 1546, ita.b.d.e.ff2.i.r1.t

In , the phrase the Pharisees came is omitted, as in D, ita.b.d.k.r1, (syrcur)

In , the phrase and be joined to his wife is omitted, as in א, B, Ψ, 892*, 2427, ℓ 48, goth.

In , it reflects  ('opened') with A, B, L, W, Ξ, 33, 579, 892, 1195, 1241, ℓ 547, syrh, pal, copsa, bo

In , it reflects  ('Elect One') with 𝔓45 𝔓75 א B L Ξ 892 1241 ita.aur.ff2.l vgst copmss

In , the phrase you are worried and being troubled about many things, but only one thing is needed is omitted, as in ita.b.d.e.ff2.i.l.r1 Ambrose

In , the phrase And Jesus said: Father forgive them, they know not what they do is omitted, agreeing with 𝔓75, א1, B, D*, W, Θ, 0124, 1241, a, Bezaelat, copsa, copbo.

 is omitted, as in D ita.b.d.e.ff2.l.r1, syrcur

In , the phrase after worshiping him is omitted, as in D ita.b.d.e.ff2.geo2.l (syrcur)

In , it reflects  ('blessing') with 𝔓75 א B C* L

In , it reflects  ('the Elect One') with 𝔓5 𝔓106vid א* itb.e.ff2* syrcur

In , the phrase the Lord having given thanks is omitted, as in D 091 ita.e syrcur

In , the phrase and his mother is omitted, as in א* W itb syrcur

In , it contains a singular reading reflecting the Greek  ('God the Father').

In , it reflects  ('he who is believing in God has life everlasting') in agreement only with syrcur.

In , it reflects  ('my bread') with א ita.e.r1

In , the text who they are who are not believing, and is omitted, as in 𝔓66* ite syrcur

In , the phrase the chief priests and the Pharisees is omitted, as in 118 itb.e

In , text reflecting  ('father') is omitted, as in א* D 1655* itd syrcur

In , the phrase our father is omitted, as in D W ita.b.c.d.e.ff2.j.l coppbo

In , the phrase had been blind and had received sight is omitted, as in 𝔓66* f1 565 itmss copbo

In , it reflects  ('Son of Man') with 𝔓66 𝔓75 א B D W copmss

In , the phrase and the life is omitted, as in 𝔓45 itl Diatessaronsyr Cyprian

In , the phrase the sister of the deceased is omitted, as in Θ itaur.b.c.e.ff2.l ac2

In , the phrase of that year is omitted, as in 𝔓45 ite

 is omitted, as in D itd

In , the phrase If God has been glorified in him is omitted, as in 𝔓66 א* B C* D L W X 579 it vgmss syrh ac2 mf cobomss

In , the phrase And he said to his disciples starts the passage, as in D ita.aur.c

 is omitted, as in X Λ* 0141 f1 565 itb vgms arm

 is omitted.

In , the phrase I came forth from the Father is omitted, as in D W itb.d.ff2 ac2 coppbo

In , the phrase just as I am not of the world is omitted, as in 𝔓66* D f13 itb.c.d.e.r1

In , the phrase the one betraying him is omitted, as in 𝔓66*vid

In John , the verse order is 13, 24, 14–15, 19–23, 16–18

In , the text reads from the opening of the tomb with א W f1 22 565 579 itd.f.r1 vgms copbo coppbo

 contains an interpolation (in bold): Woman, why are you weeping? Who are you seeking? This reading is supported by A* D 579 1424

 contains a singular reading (in bold): And after eight days, on the first day of the Sabbath (week?)

In , the passage concludes with yet, they knew not as with 𝔓66 א L Ψ 33 844 lat

In , it reflects  ('upon giving thanks, he gave it to them') as with D itf.r1 vgmss

See also
 Aramaic New Testament
 Codex Sinaiticus
 Saint Catherine’s Monastery

References

Further reading
 Margaret Dunlop Gibson (1893), How the Codex was Found. A Narrative of Two Visits to Sinai from Mrs. Lewis’s Journals. 1892–1893 (Cambridge: Macmillan & Bowes).
 Agnes Smith Lewis (1898), In the Shadow of Sinai. A Story travel and Research from 1895 to 1897 (Cambridge: Macmillan & Bowes).
 Sebastian P. Brock (2016), Two Hitherto Unattested Passages of the Old Syriac Gospels in Palimpsests from St Catherine’s Monastery, Sinai, Δελτίο βιβλικῶν Μελετῶν 31A, pp. 7–18.

External links

 Agnes Smith Lewis Catalogue of the Syriac mss. in the Convent of S. Catharine on Mount Sinai (1894)
 Sebastian P. Brock under Sinai Palimpsest Project

4th-century biblical manuscripts
Syriac manuscripts
Saint Catherine's Monastery